No. 1419 (Tactical Support) Flight RAF was a flight within the Royal Air Force.

History

Second World War
No. 419 (Special Duties) Flight was formed at RAF North Weald on 21 August 1940. It moved to RAF Stradishall where it was disbanded to form No. 1419 (Special Duties) Flight on 1 March 1941, continuing to fly Westland Lysander aircraft, Armstrong Whitworth Whitley bombers and Martin Maryland reconnaissance bombers on Special Operations Executive clandestine operations. The flight was disbanded at RAF Newmarket on 25 August 1941 to form No. 138 Squadron RAF which continued flying clandestine support missions for the remainder of World War II.

Iraq War
No. 1419 (Tactical Support) Flight RAF was resurrected at Basra, Iraq from elements of No. 28 Squadron RAF and No. 78 Squadron RAF from RAF Benson flying AgustaWestland Merlin HC.3 helicopters in support of Operation Telic as part of Joint Helicopter Force (Iraq) until the British drawdown in Iraq, the flight then being relocated to Afghanistan, in support of Operation Herrick.

Afghanistan

The flight was relocated to Camp Bastion as part of Joint Helicopter Force (Afghanistan) in 2009.

The flight was disbanded in May 2013 when the aircraft were returned to the UK.

References

Citations

Bibliography

 Lake, Alan. Flying Units of the RAF. Shrewsbury, Shropshire, UK: Airlife Publishing, 1999. .
 Sturtivant, Ray, ISO and John Hamlin. RAF Flying Training And Support Units since 1912. Tonbridge, Kent, UK: Air-Britain (Historians) Ltd., 2007. .

1419 Flight
Military units and formations established in 2005
Military units and formations established in 1957
Royal Air Force
2005 establishments in the United Kingdom